Two Wells is a town approximately  north of the Adelaide city centre in South Australia adjacent to Port Wakefield Road and passed by the Adelaide-Port Augusta railway line. The first settlers in the area used two aboriginal wells in the area as a freshwater source.

The two wells
Originally the wells were natural and permanent waterholes. In the 1880s the wells were deepened and strengthened to facilitate regular use by travelling stock. By 1900 a water pipeline supplied the area, and the wells were neglected. In the 1960s a local youth group rehabilitated the wells and surrounding area, but after a time they were again neglected. In 1979 the area was again rehabilitated, partly fenced, and signed as a reserve. It continues to be maintained by interested locals.

Governance 
The boundaries were of the town officially fixed on 21 June 1990. Two Wells is located in the federal division of Grey, the state electoral district of Taylor and the local government area of the Adelaide Plains Council.

Media
The local newspaper is the Two Wells and Districts Echo, began as a newsletter in 1978, before changing to newspaper tabloid format in 2010. Servicing around 4,000 households in both Two Wells and Lewiston, between 2002 and 2010, it was known as "Your Local Echo", and prior to that as simply "Newsletter (Two Wells Community Advancement Association)". Along with a sister publication, Plains Producer, it is produced by Papers & Publications, whose main office is on Howe Street, Balaklava.

Notable persons
James Park Woods who was born in Two Wells in 1886, enlisted in the Australian Imperial Forces in 1916 and was awarded a Victoria Cross for gallantry during preliminary attacks on the Hindenburg Line in September 1918. Woods survived the war and returned to a career in viticulture in Western Australia.

ABC TV host Annabell Crabb was born and went to school in Two Wells.

References

Further reading 
 Williams, B.; (1991), Two Wells - Then and Now: A history of the Hundred of Port Gawler, B/T Publishing, Two Wells, SA
Two Wells, Mallala and District History Book Committee, (1985), Life around the Light; a History of the Mallala District Council Area, The Community Development Board of the Council District of Mallala, Mallala, SA

External links 
 'Place Names of South Australia - Two Wells' in The Manning Index of South Australian History, retrieved 27 August 2012.

Towns in South Australia